The 2014–15 Austin Peay Governors basketball team represented Austin Peay State University during the 2014–15 NCAA Division I men's basketball season. The Governors, led by 25th year head coach Dave Loos, played their home games at the Dunn Center and were members of the West Division of the Ohio Valley Conference. They finished the season 8–22, 3–13 in OVC play to finish in last place in the West Division. They failed to qualify for the OVC Tournament.

Roster

Schedule

|-
!colspan=9 style="background:#A40936; color:#F9F4EA;"| Exhibition

|-
!colspan=9 style="background:#A40936; color:#F9F4EA;"| Regular Season

References

Austin Peay Governors men's basketball seasons
Austin Peay
Austin Peay
Austin Peay